This article refers to crime in the U.S. state of Oklahoma.

Statistics
In 2008, there were 145,144 crimes reported in Oklahoma, including 212 murders. In 2014, there were 131,726 crimes reported, including 175 murders.

168 people were murdered on April 19, 1995, in the Oklahoma City bombing.

On June 13, 1977, three young girls were raped and murdered at Camp Scott, a Girl Scout Camp located in Mayes County, Oklahoma. The case remains unsolved.

Capital punishment laws

Capital punishment is applied in this state.

References